Maryam Salimi (20 January 1978) is a writer, journalist, communications scholar and expert in visual communications particularly in infographics and news graphics.

Early life 
She received her PhD in social communications, her master's degree in graphics and journalism and her bachelor's degree in public relations. Her master's thesis focused on news graphics and infographics and her dissertation was centered around data journalism which was studied in detail for the first time in Iran.

Career 
She currently lectures in Islamic Azad University, Soore University and University of Applied Science and Technology. Salimi is a member of educational content and book graphics task force in Organization for Educational Research and Planning related to Ministry of Education and is one of the authors of Visual Literacy Book for tenth grade. She is the media consultant for many organizations, article advisor of a number of scientific journals and is the mediator/facilitator in student festivals.

Salimi is the head of news graphics and infographics teams in Nasim News Agency and in cooperation with Behrouz Mazloumifar (her spouse), she has produced more than 1000 static infographics and recently a number of interactive ones. She has worked in the field of data journalism (written and visual) for 20 years and public relations for 17 years.

She has started working in publications from Khabar Newspaper and has worked for Bavar weekly, Toseeh newspaper, Abrar Economic newspaper, Donya-e-Eqtesad newspaper, Public Relations monthly and Honar-e-Hashtom quarterly as a journalist, reporter, assistant editor, caricaturist, graphic artist and arts director. She has also worked with Fars News Agency for 12 years and Tasnim News Agency from 2013.

Salimi along with a group of artists and designers in news and infographics set up the first infographics exhibition in the 20th Press Festival (11 March 2013). She held the first official news and infographics training course in Bureau of Media Studies and Planning (affiliated to press section of the Ministry of Culture and Islamic Guidance) in September 2014.

She has introduced News and Infographics 2 (Interactive) during the press exhibition in 2014 and 2015. 

Salimi has been acclaimed mostly in the field of journalism and graphics in 14th to 19th Press Festival and has received awards in the first Farsi Infographics Festival, Khakriz-e-Shishe’I Festival,
She has also received some accolades in several poetry festivals.

Bibliography

Author
 News Graphics and Infographics, younes Shokrkhah and Maryam Salimi Bureau of Media Studies and Planning, 2014.
 Walking Without You (Taradod Bi To), Ashian Publication, 2011.
 Blue Plate (Pelak-e-Abi), Ashian Publication, 2010.
 Public Relations: Associate to Bachelor Degree Exams for the University of Applied Science and Technology, Emamat Publication, 2012.

Translation
 Infographics 2, Alberto Cairo, Translated by Ahmad Ashrafi and Maryam Salimi, Soroush Publication, 2015.

Awards 
Salimi has been honored and awarded several festivals and ceremonies:
 Government critic in the 14th Press Festival 
 Best report in news agencies in the 15th Press and News Agencies Festival
 Best interview in news agencies in 18th Press Festival
 One of the best reports in news agencies in 19th Press Festival
 Third rank in Interview category in Banking Industry Festival
 Second rank in Interview category in the 1st Car Festival
 One of the top ten in Muslim Journalists Association
 Best poetry in Nedaye Vahdat International Festival
 Best artist in Fajr Afarinan Festival
 best report in the 3rd Press and News Agencies Festival in Tax Category
 Iran in Olympics in Infographics Festival

References 

Iranian journalists
1978 births
Living people
Iranian women journalists